The Marnes de Gan is a geologic formation in France. It preserves fossils dating back to the Paleogene period.

See also

 List of fossiliferous stratigraphic units in France

References
 

Geologic formations of France
Paleogene France
Eocene Series of Europe
Ypresian Stage
Marl formations
Paleontology in France